Oqaban Hindukush  or the Hindukush Eagles is a professional football club in Afghanistan. They play in the Afghanistan Champions League. It was founded in August 2012 by the creation of Afghan Premier League and its players have been chosen through a casting-show called Maidan-E-Sabz (Green Field). Based in the city of Ghazni, club represents provinces of Ghazni, Bamyan, Parwan, Panjshir, Daykundi and Wardak in the central region of Afghanistan.

Players

Current squad

Honours

National
Afghan Premier League
Runners-up (1): 2014

References

Football clubs in Afghanistan
Ghazni Province
2012 establishments in Afghanistan
Association football clubs established in 2012